Ignaty Nikolayevich Potapenko (December 30, 1856 – May 17, 1929), was a Russian writer and playwright.

Biography
Potapenko was born in the village of Fyodorovka, Kherson Governorate, Russian Empire (now Ukraine) where his father was a priest. Potapenko studied at Odessa University, and at the Saint Petersburg Conservatory. His first works were tales of Ukrainian life. He's best known for his novel A Russian Priest (1890), published in Vestnik Evropy (Herald of Europe). His works include novels, plays, and short stories.

English translations 
The General's Daughter, (novel), T. Fisher Unwin, 1892.
A Father of Six, and An Occasional Holiday, (short novels), T. Fisher Unwin, 1893. from Archive.org
A Thousand Talents, (story), from Anthology of Russian Literature, Volume 2, Leo Wiener, G. P. Putnam's Sons, 1903. from Archive.org
The Curse of Fame, (story), from Short Story Classics (Foreign) Volume 1, P.F. Collier, 1907. from Archive.org
What Dmitro Saw At the War, (story), from The Soul of Russia, W. Stephens, Macmillan and Co. LTD, London, 1916. from Archive.org
A Russian Priest, (novel), T. Fisher Unwin, 1916. from Archive.org
Dethroned, (story), from Best Russian Short Stories, Boni and Liveright, 1917. from Archive.org

References 

1856 births
1929 deaths
Russian people of Ukrainian descent
Russian male novelists
Russian dramatists and playwrights
Russian male dramatists and playwrights
Russian male short story writers